Ingress, egress, and regress are legal terms referring respectively to entering, leaving, and returning to a property or country. The term also refers to the rights of a person (such as a lessee) to do so as regards a specific property. The term was also used in the Ingress into India Ordinance, 1914 when the British government wanted to screen, detain, and restrict the movement of people returning to India, particularly those involved in the Ghadar Movement.

In a sale and purchase contract, it means that the buyer gets full rights to insure the property according to Standard A.

See also
Ingress

References 

Black's Law Dictionary (5th edition). West: St. Paul (MN), 1979.

Property law